Friedrich Hermann Heinrich "Fritz" Kraatz (4 February 1906 – 15 January 1992) was a Swiss ice hockey player who competed in the 1928 Winter Olympics.

He was a member of the Swiss ice hockey team, which won the bronze medal.

External links
profile

1906 births
1992 deaths
Ice hockey players at the 1928 Winter Olympics
International Ice Hockey Federation executives
Medalists at the 1928 Winter Olympics
Olympic bronze medalists for Switzerland
Olympic ice hockey players of Switzerland
Olympic medalists in ice hockey
People from Davos
Sportspeople from Graubünden